The 77th Texas Legislature met from January 9, 2001 to May 28, 2001.

Sessions

Regular Session: January 9, 2001 - May 28, 2001

Party summary

Senate

House

Officers

Senate
 Lieutenant Governor: Bill Ratliff (acting), Republican
 President Pro Tempore: Chris Harris, Republican

House
 Speaker of the House: Pete Laney, Democrat

Members

Senate

House

External links

77th Texas Legislature
2001 in Texas
2001 U.S. legislative sessions